Imelda Staunton is an English actress who has received various awards and nominations, including four Laurence Olivier Awards, a British Academy Film Award, and a Screen Actors Guild Award. Additionally, she has been nominated for an Academy Award, two Golden Globe Awards, and a Primetime Emmy Award. In 2016, Staunton was appointed Commander of the Order of the British Empire (CBE) in honour of her services to drama.

Staunton debuted in the West End in 1982 and the same year, she earned her first nomination for the Laurence Olivier Award for Best Actress in a Musical for The Beggar's Opera. Her first Laurence Olivier Award win came in 1985, when her performances in A Chorus of Disapproval and The Corn Is Green went on to collect the Best Performance in a Supporting Role prize. Following a second Laurence Olivier Award win in 1991 for her lead performance as the Baker's Wife in the original London production of Into the Woods, Staunton's breakthrough role as the titular 1950s working-class provider of illegal abortions in Mike Leigh's critically acclaimed drama film Vera Drake (2004)  won her the Volpi Cup for Best Actress at the Venice Film Festival, the BAFTA Award for Best Actress in a Leading Role, the British Independent Film Award for Best Actress, the European Film Award for Best Actress and the New York Film Critics Circle Award for Best Actress, and she was nominated for the Academy Award for Best Actress, the Golden Globe Award for Best Actress in a Motion Picture – Drama, the Screen Actors Guild Award for Outstanding Performance by a Female Actor in a Leading Role and the Critics' Choice Movie Award for Best Actress. The following year, she appeared in the television film My Family and Other Animals and was nominated for the International Emmy Award for Best Actress for her performance as Louisa Durrell.

In 2007, Staunton received international mainstream recognition for playing the antagonist Dolores Umbridge in Harry Potter and the Order of the Phoenix, the fifth instalment of the Harry Potter film series, and her performance earned her a nomination for the Saturn Award for Best Supporting Actress. Staunton's other television credits include the 2010 Christmas special miniseries Return to Cranford and the 2012 biographical film The Girl. For her portrayal of Alma Reville Hitchcock in the latter, she was nominated for the Primetime Emmy Award for Outstanding Supporting Actress in a Miniseries or a Movie, the British Academy Television Award for Best Supporting Actress and the Critics' Choice Television Award for Best Supporting Actress in a Movie or a Miniseries. Staunton's appearance in the role of human rights activist Hefina Headon in the historical comedy-drama film Pride (2014) brought her the British Independent Film Award for Best Supporting Actress as well as a nomination for the BAFTA Award for Best Actress in a Supporting Role. Alongside her film work, Staunton starred in a number of plays in the West End in the 2000s and went on to receive widespread acclaim for her performances in the 2012 London revival of Sweeney Todd as Mrs. Lovett and in the 2015 London revival of Gypsy as Momma Rose, winning the Laurence Olivier Award for Best Actress in a Musical for both in 2013 and 2016 respectively.

Awards and nominations

Honours

Notes

References

External links 
 

Staunton, Imelda